Prossedi (locally Prussedi) is a comune (municipality) in the province of Latina in the Italian region Lazio, located about  southeast of Rome and about  east of Latina.

Prossedi borders the following municipalities: Amaseno, Giuliano di Roma, Maenza, Priverno, Roccasecca dei Volsci, Villa Santo Stefano.

The village was founded by refugees from the destruction of Priverno in the 7th century. It was a possession of several baronial families, including the Chigi and the Conti. The most notable feature is the Romanesque church of San Nicola.

References

Cities and towns in Lazio